The 1985 Intercontinental Final was the eleventh running of the Intercontinental Final as part of the qualification for the 1985 Speedway World Championship. The 1985 Final was run on 3 August at the Vetlanda Speedway in Vetlanda, Sweden, and was the last qualifying stage for riders from Scandinavia, the USA and from the Commonwealth nations for the World Final to be held at the Odsal Stadium in Bradford, England.

Intercontinental Final
 3 August
  Vetlanda, Vetlanda Speedway
 Qualification: Top 11 plus 1 reserve to the World Final in Bradford, England

References

See also
 Motorcycle Speedway

1985
World Individual
International sports competitions hosted by Sweden